The 1973–74 Bulgarian Cup was the 34th season of the Bulgarian Cup (in this period the tournament was named Cup of the Soviet Army). CSKA Sofia won the competition, beating Levski Sofia 2–1 after extra time in the final at the Vasil Levski National Stadium.

First round

|}

Second round

|}

Quarter-finals

|}

Semi-finals

Semi-finals A

Semi-finals B

Final

Details

References

1973-74
1973–74 domestic association football cups
Cup